Marvel Marilyn Maxwell (August 3, 1921 – March 20, 1972) was an American actress and entertainer. In a career that spanned the 1940s and 1950s, she appeared in several films and radio programs, and entertained the troops during World War II and the Korean War on USO tours with Bob Hope.

Early years
Maxwell was a native of Clarinda, Iowa. During the 1930s, she worked as an usher in Fort Wayne, Indiana at the Rialto Theater located at 2616 South Calhoun Street. 
In Fort Wayne, she attended Central High School. She dropped out of school in her sophomore year to join an Indianapolis band as a singer.

Career

She started her professional entertaining career as a radio singer and a singer on stage with Ted Weems' big band while still a teenager, then she signed with Metro-Goldwyn-Mayer in 1942 as a contract player. Among the radio programs in which she appeared were Beat the Band and The Abbott and Costello Show. Louis B. Mayer, the head of MGM, insisted she change the Marvel part of her real name. She dropped her first name and kept the middle one.  Some of her film roles included Lost in a Harem (1944) with Abbott and Costello, Champion (1949) with Kirk Douglas, The Lemon Drop Kid (1951) with Bob Hope, New York Confidential (1955) with Broderick Crawford, and Rock-A-Bye Baby (1958) with Jerry Lewis. The popular Christmas song "Silver Bells" made its debut in The Lemon Drop Kid, sung by Maxwell and Hope.

Maxwell appeared twice as a singer in the second season (1955–1956) of The Jimmy Durante Show.

She appeared as the mystery guest of 'What's My Line ' 10th of May 1953. At one point, a blind-folded panelist asked whether or not she was Marilyn Monroe.

Personal life
Maxwell married three times; each ended in divorce. In September 1944, she married actor John Conte; the relationship was dissolved in June 1946. Her second marriage to restaurateur Anders McIntyre lasted just over a year from January 1, 1950 until March 23, 1951. Maxwell's six-year marriage to writer/producer Jerry Davis ended in 1960. Her only child, Matthew, was born to Maxwell and Davis in 1956.

Maxwell met and became friends with Frank Sinatra when they crossed paths, both of them in separate nationally renowned big bands in the late 1930s.  Their friendship continued after Marilyn gave up singing for acting and moved to Hollywood and Frank had moved from New Jersey to Beverly Hills in the early 1940s. By 1945, the friendship had progressed into an extra-marital affair. Frank's then wife Nancy saw Marilyn wearing a diamond bracelet Nancy had earlier seen in Frank's car and assumed was for her. Taking this as evidence of Frank's infidelity, Nancy ordered Marilyn and husband John Conte to immediately leave the Sinatra family Christmas gala of 1945. Confronted after the party by Nancy, Frank admitted to the affair but claimed it was only casual not serious. Soon after, Marilyn and Frank ended their sexual liaison.

Between 1950 and 1954, Marilyn had an ongoing affair with actor/comedian Bob Hope. Although he was married at the time to singer Dolores Reade Hope, Bob and Marilyn's relationship was so open that many in Hollywood referred to her as Mrs. Bob Hope.

During the 1950s, Marilyn became good friends with fellow actor Rock Hudson. After her marriage to Jerry Davis ended in 1960 at the arrangement of Hudson's agent Henry Willson, Marilyn became one of several women Hudson publicly "dated" to counter rumors (admitted true by him later in life) of the actor's homosexuality. No real romance between Maxwell and Hudson existed.

On March 20, 1972, at age 50, Maxwell was found dead in her home by her 15-year-old son, who had arrived home from school. The cause was an apparent heart attack; she had been treated for hypertension and pulmonary disease. Bob Hope, Bing Crosby, Frank Sinatra, and Jack Benny were honorary pallbearers at her funeral.

Radio appearances

Filmography

Features

Stand by for Action (1942) – Audrey Carr
Dr. Gillespie's Criminal Case (1943) – Ruth Edly
Salute to the Marines (1943) – Helen Bailey
Thousands Cheer (1943) – Drug Store Clerk in Red Skelton Skit
Swing Fever (1943) – Ginger Gray
Three Men in White (1944) – Ruth Edley
Lost in a Harem (1944) – Hazel Moon
Between Two Women (1945) – Ruth Edley
The Show-Off (1946) – Amy Fisher Piper
High Barbaree (1947) – Diana Case
Summer Holiday (1948) – Belle
Race Street (1948) – Robbie Lawrence
Champion (1949) – Grace
Key to the City (1950) – Sheila
Outside the Wall (1950) – Charlotte Maynard
The Lemon Drop Kid (1951) – 'Brainey' Baxter
New Mexico (1951) – Cherry
Off Limits (1952) – Connie Curtis
East of Sumatra (1953) – Lory Hale
Paris Model (1953) – Marion Parmalee
New York Confidential (1955) – Iris Palmer
Rock-A-Bye Baby (1958) – Carla Naples
Critic's Choice (1963) – Ivy London
Stage to Thunder Rock (1964) – Leah Parker
The Lively Set (1964) – Marge Owens
Arizona Bushwhackers (1968) – Molly
From Nashville with Music (1969) – Mabel
The Phynx (1970) – Herself

Short subjects
Screen Snapshots: Hollywood Goes to Bat (1950) – Herself
Brooklyn Goes to Las Vegas (1956) – Herself

References

Further reading

External links

 
 
 
 
Audio of Beat the Band April 7, 1940 episode Maxwell appears as Marvel Maxwell.

1921 births
1972 deaths
American radio actresses
Actresses from Iowa
American film actresses
Metro-Goldwyn-Mayer contract players
People from Clarinda, Iowa
Iowa Republicans
California Republicans
Singers from Iowa
Actresses from Indiana
Singers from Indiana
Actors from Fort Wayne, Indiana
20th-century American actresses
20th-century American singers
20th-century American women singers